Patrick Naughton  is an American software developer and convicted sex offender. He is one of the creators of the Java programming language.

Career

Early career 
In 1983, Naughton co-wrote a MacPaint clone, Painter's Apprentice, with Russ Nelson.

Sun Microsystems 

As a Sun Microsystems engineer, Patrick Naughton had become frustrated with the state of Sun's C++ and C APIs (application programming interfaces) and tools. While considering moving to NeXT, Naughton was offered a chance to work on new technology and thus the Stealth Project was started.

The Stealth Project was soon renamed to the Green Project with James Gosling and Mike Sheridan joining Naughton.  Together with other engineers, they began work in a small office on Sand Hill Road in Menlo Park, California. They were attempting to develop a new technology for programming next generation smart appliances, which Sun expected to be a major new opportunity.

In June and July 1994, after three days of brainstorming with John Gage, the Director of Science for Sun, James Gosling,  Bill Joy, Naughton, Wayne Rosing, and Eric Schmidt, the team re-targeted the platform for the World Wide Web. They felt that with the advent of the first graphical web browser, Mosaic, the Internet was on its way to evolving into the same highly interactive medium that they had envisioned for cable TV. As a prototype, Naughton wrote a small browser, WebRunner, later renamed HotJava.

After Sun 
In 1994, Naughton quit Sun for Starwave (then a property of Paul Allen) to develop server Java applications for web sites.  He was the author of "The Java Handbook", (Osborne, 1995) and co-author of Java: The Complete Reference, with Herbert Schildt (Osborne, 1996)

In 1998, Walt Disney Internet Group acquired Starwave and amalgamated it with Infoseek in the Go Network company. As a result, Naughton became executive vice president of Infoseek.

After his arrest in 1999, Naughton was fired from Infoseek.

Sex crime arrest and conviction
On Sept. 14, 1999, Naughton flew from Seattle to Los Angeles on a private Disney jet.  expecting a five-foot, blonde haired 13-year-old
girl to wait on the pier near the roller coaster, carrying a green backpack as instructed by Naughton.  Naughton had
written to her about love and sex and that he "wanted to get
[her] alone in his hotel room and have [her] strip naked for him".  Naughton had arranged this meeting, posing as "Hot Seattle", his online predator handle in an online chat room called "dad&daughtersex." The "girl" was actually an FBI agent.

Two days later, he was arrested by the FBI and was charged with traveling in interstate commerce with the intent to have sex with a minor, in violation of 18 U.S.C. §2423(b). After a trial ended in a hung jury, Naughton struck a plea agreement where he took a reduced sentence and admitted that he traveled from Seattle to Los Angeles last September with a "dominant purpose" to engage in sexual acts with "KrisLA", an online chat buddy he believed was a 13-year-old girl.  He ended up serving no prison time, in exchange for working for the FBI for free for a year.

Novel defense
His line of defense was that he claimed he was persuaded to participate online in a ritualized sexual role-playing exercise, dealing with a mature woman acting as a girl.   His then-novel defense, became known as the fantasy defense for pedophiles.

See also

History of Java
Online identity
Sexual predator
Internet-initiated sex crimes against minors

References

External links
Mr. Famous Comes Home a Forbes magazine interview with Naughton

Living people
Sun Microsystems people
Java (programming language)
American computer scientists
Programming language designers
People convicted of sex crimes
Child sexual abuse in the United States
Year of birth missing (living people)